José Dionisio Brito Rodríguez (born 15 January 1973) is a Venezuelan administrator and politician who serves as a deputy to the National Assembly and former member of Justice First party.

Biography 
Brito studied Business Administration at the Simón Rodríguez National Experimental University (UNESR).

He belonged to the Movement for Socialism (MAS) party, and then joined the ranks of the Podemos party.

He was elected councilor for the Municipality Simon Rodriguez in 2005 municipal elections, a position he held until 2008. In the elections of 2013 postulated for mayor of the Municipality Simon Rodriguez with the support of the table the Democratic Unit, obtaining 34% and 25,618 votes, losing to the PSUV candidate, Jesús Figuera.

Under the banner of the Justice First party, he ran in the 2015 Venezuelan parliamentary election as a deputy for the Anzoátegui State, a seat he gets for the 2016–2021 period.

Controversies 

The Armando.Info portal pointed to Brito as one of those implicated in alleged acts of corruption to "cleanse the reputation" of Colombian businessmen linked to the government of Nicolás Maduro and the network of embezzlement of social assistance funds of the Local Committees for Supply and Production (CLAP). In response to these reports, Brito said that 70 deputies demanded that Juan Guaidó the state of the resources received from the humanitarian aid. Guaidó said he did not know of any letter signed by 70 deputies. The same day, the United States Agency for International Development (USAID) clarified that the interim government chaired by Guaido does not administer money from humanitarian aid.

Days later on 2 December 2019, Brito said that "there is a rebellion in the Assembly" against the president of the parliament, Juan Guaidó and will abstain in the vote for a new legislative president on 5 January 2020.

Sanctions 

The United States Department of the Treasury sanctioned Brito, Luis Parra and others, "who, at the bidding of Maduro, attempted to block the democratic process in Venezuela," according to US Secretary of Treasury Steven Mnuchin on 13 January 2020. The sanctioned have their assets in the US frozen and are not allowed to do business with US financial markets nor with US citizens.

References 

1973 births
Living people
Venezuelan politicians
Members of the National Assembly (Venezuela)
People of the Crisis in Venezuela